The 2012 Summer Olympics, officially known as the Games of the XXX Olympiad, were a summer multi-sport event held in London, the capital of the United Kingdom, from 27 July to 12 August. A total of 10,768 athletes from 204 nations participated in 302 events in 26 sports across 39 different disciplines.

Overall, 86 nations received at least one medal, and 55 of them won at least one gold medal. Athletes from the United States won the most medals overall, with 104, and the most gold medals, with 47. The latter record is the largest gold medal haul for the country at a non-US hosted Olympics. Host nation Great Britain won 29 gold medals and 65 overall medals making it the most successful Olympics performance for that nation since the 1908 edition.

Michael Phelps and Missy Franklin won the most gold medals at the games with four each. Phelps also won the greatest number of medals overall winning six in total. Bahrain, Botswana, Cyprus, Gabon, Grenada, Guatemala, and Montenegro all won their first Olympic medals with Bahrain and Grenada winning their nation's first Olympic gold medal. Previously, Montenegrin athletes had competed as nationals of Serbia and Montenegro and of Yugoslavia. Taekwondo athlete Milica Mandić from Serbia won the first Olympic gold medal for that nation as an independent nation. 

During and after the games, many athletes who were caught doping or tested positive for banned substances were disqualified from competition and had their medals revoked. To date, 40 medals have been stripped, with Russia accounting for 17 of those.

Medal table 

 

The medal table is based on information provided by the International Olympic Committee (IOC) and is consistent with IOC convention in its published medal tables. By default, the table is ordered by the number of gold medals the athletes from a nation have won, where nation is an entity represented by a National Olympic Committee (NOC). The number of silver medals is taken into consideration next and then the number of bronze medals. 

In boxing, judo, taekwondo, and wrestling, two bronze medals are awarded in each weight class. Two silver medals (and no bronze) were awarded for second place ties in both the men's 200 metre freestyle swimming and the men's 100 metre butterfly swimming events. Two bronze medals were awarded for a third-place tie in the men's keirin cycling race; three bronze medals were awarded for a three-way third-place tie in the men's high jump.

Key
 Changes in medal standings (see below)

Changes in medal standings

On 29 August 2016, a report indicated that a retested sample for Besik Kudukhov of Russia, the silver medalist in the men's 60 kg freestyle wrestling event, had returned a positive result (later disclosed as dehydrochlormethyltestosterone). Kudukhov died in a car crash in December 2013. On 27 October 2016, the International Olympic Committee (IOC) dropped all disciplinary proceedings against Kudukhov, stating that such proceedings cannot be conducted against a deceased person.

Key
 Disqualified athlete(s)

Negative signs indicate either that medals were stripped or that medals were exchanged when upgraded to silver or gold in a reallocation.

See also 

 All-time Olympic Games medal table
 2012 Summer Paralympics medal table

Notes

References

External links 
 
 
 

Medal table
Summer Olympics medal tables
London sport-related lists